Calliostoma iris is a species of sea snail, a marine gastropod mollusk in the family Calliostomatidae.

Some authors place this taxon in the subgenus Calliostoma (Ampullotrochus)

Description
The size of the shell varies between 20 mm and 30 mm.

Distribution
This marine species occurs off Japan and New Caledonia.

References

External links
 

iris
Gastropods described in 1961